Amanda Park is a census designated place on the Olympic Peninsula in Grays Harbor County, Washington, United States, along U.S. Route 101. Olympic National Park and Lake Quinault are directly to the north. As of the 2010 census the population was 252.

Geography
The community is near the northern border of Grays Harbor County, on the Quinault River at the outlet of Lake Quinault. It is in the northeast corner of the Quinault Indian Nation. U.S. 101 passes through the center of the community, leading northwest  to Queets on the Pacific coast and south  to Aberdeen. The Quinault Valley entrance to Olympic National Park is accessible from North Shore Road, which leaves US 101 at the northern edge of the CDP.

Climate
Despite heavy annual precipitation due to strong influence from the nearby Pacific, Amanda Park's climate still has a significant drying trend in July to classify it as a warm-summer Mediterranean climate (Köppen Csb).

References

External links
Quinault Indian Nation

Census-designated places in Washington (state)
Census-designated places in Grays Harbor County, Washington
Quinault settlements